Ralph Oscar Yeager, AIA, (1892 – 1960) was an American architect who worked in Indiana. He was a partner in the Terre Haute, Indiana architectural firm of Miller & Yeager and the Indianapolis, Indiana architectural firm of Vonnegut, Wright & Yeager.

Early life and education
Yeager was born August 16, 1892 in Danville, Illinois, where he graduated from high school. He then attended the School of Architecture at the University of Illinois for two years (1911–1913) and then earned a Bachelor of Science degree in architecture for the University of Pennsylvania, class of 1915.

Early career
Yeager supervised construction on the U.S. Post Office Building (1915–1917) for Yeager & Sons, Contractors, served as a second lieutenant in the army during World War I (1917–1918), and was variously employed architectural offices in Chicago, Terre Haute, and Madison, Wisconsin. In 1922, he established his own practice in Chicago before returning to Terre Haute the next year (1923) to become a partner in the firm Miller & Yeager.

Miller & Yeager
Miller & Yeager, located at 402 Opera House Building, Terre Haute, Indiana, was responsible for many landmarks in Indianapolis and greater Indiana, and a number have been listed on the National Register of Historic Places.

In 1946, he was the sole surviving partner of Miller & Yeager and merged the firm with Vonnegut, Bohn & Mueller and Pierre & Wright, both of Indianapolis, Indiana.

Professional organizations
He was the president of the Indiana Society of Architects in 1937, 1945–1946, the Indiana chapter of the American Institute of Architects in 1945-1946, member of the Indian Society of Architects from 1923 and chapter of the AIA since 1926 (the two merged in 1946), director of the Great Lakes District of the AIA in 1946-7.

Notable works

Works by Miller & Yeager Architects

Coca-Cola Company Building, Terre Haute, Indiana, built for $200,000.
Terre Haute Post Office and Federal Building, built for $450,000.
Terre Haute City Hall, built for $250,000.
Woodrow Wilson Junior High School (Terre Haute, Indiana) (1927), built for $750,000.
First Church of Christ Scientist (Terre Haute, Indiana), built for $175,000
Young Men's Christian Association (Terre Haute, Indiana), built for approximately $275,000
Zorah Shrine (Terre Haute, Indiana), built for $300,000
Union Hospital (Terre Haute, Indiana), built for $375,000

Works by Vonnegut, Wright & Yeager
Stalker Hall, Indiana State University, built in 1954 for $920,000 (renovated 2004-2006)

References

External links

1892 births
Architects from Indianapolis
People from Terre Haute, Indiana
American people of German descent
20th-century American architects
Beaux Arts architects
Gothic Revival architects
Art Deco architects
United States Army personnel of World War I
University of Pennsylvania School of Design alumni
University of Illinois alumni
1960 deaths